"I Mean It" is a song by American rapper G-Eazy featuring fellow American rapper Remo. It was released on May 13, 2014, as the fifth single from the former's debut studio album These Things Happen (2014), The song was written and produced by the artists alongside Christoph Andersson.
Despite peaking at number 98 on the US Billboard Hot 100, it was still certified 3× Platinum by the RIAA on February 8, 2018. A remix was released featuring an additional verse by Rick Ross.

Critical reception
David Drake of Pitchfork compared "I Mean It" to the work of Big Sean, citing the song as evidence that "Big Sean may have had a bigger influence on millennial rap fans than has generally been acknowledged".

Chart performance
In the United States, "I Mean It" debuted at number 100 on the Billboard Hot 100 chart for the issue dated January 15, 2015. The song left the chart, before re-entering and peaking at number 98 for the issue dated February 14, 2015. It spent a total of four non-consecutive weeks on the chart. "I Mean It" became G-Eazy's first top 40 song on any music chart, peaking at number 20 and 27 on the Hot Rap Songs and Hot R&B/Hip-Hop Songs charts, respectively. In 2014, the song reached number 88 on the year-end Hot R&B/Hip-Hop Songs chart. Nearly four years after its release, "I Mean It" was certified triple platinum by the Recording Industry Association of America (RIAA) for sales of three million paid digital downloads.

Music video
The video premiered on Vevo, then YouTube, on May 28, 2014.

It was produced by Abby Vo and directed by Bobby Bruderle, who has been a frequent collaborator of G-Eazy's, having done photography work for him since 2011 and directing other videos of his such as "Almost Famous" and "Been On."

In the video, G-Eazy plays a news anchor whose news report is the lyrics of the song, including the chorus, sung by Remo, which G-Eazy lip-syncs. (Remo does not appear in the video.) G-Eazy is at one point shown interviewing himself. The camera occasionally cuts to a female news correspondent, played by Paige Hurd. The video also shows various people watching the news broadcast on TV. Rapper Kyle makes an appearance.

Live performance
On July 24, 2014, G-Eazy made his U.S. television debut performing on Late Night with Seth Meyers performing "I Mean It" and "Far Alone".

Track listings and formats
Digital download
"I Mean It" featuring Remo – 3:56

Digital download (Remix)
"I Mean It" (Remix) featuring Rick Ross and Remo – 3:58

Streaming (Live performance)
"I Mean It" (Live from Spotify SXSW 2014) – 4:07

Credits and personnel
G-Eazy – writer, vocals, additional production
Remo the Hitmaker – writer, vocals, producer
Christoph Andersson – writer, producer, recording at Endless Summer Studios
Jaycen Joshua – mixing at Larrabee Sound Studios (North Hollywood)
Ryan Kaul – mixing assistant
Dave Kutch – mastering at The Mastering Palace (New York City)

Credits and personnel adapted from These Things Happen album liner notes.

Charts

Weekly charts

Year-end charts

Certifications and sales

References

External links

2014 singles
2014 songs
G-Eazy songs
RCA Records singles
Songs written by G-Eazy